The women's 4 × 5 kilometre relay competition in cross-country skiing at the 2022 Winter Olympics was held on 12 February, at the Kuyangshu Nordic Center and Biathlon Center in Zhangjiakou. Yuliya Stupak, Natalya Nepryayeva, Tatiana Sorina, Veronika Stepanova, representing the Russian Olympic Committee, won the event, the first Russian win since 2006. Germany were second, and Sweden third.

Summary
Norway were the defending champion, and Sweden and Russian Olympic Committee athletes were the 2018 silver and bronze medalist, respectively. The only relay in the 2021–22 FIS Cross-Country World Cup was won by Russia, with Sweden second and Norway third. Norway were also the 2021 World Champion, with Russian Ski Federation second and Finland third. Only five nations – Finland, Germany, Norway, Russia, and Sweden – ever won the women's Olympic cross-country skiing relay.

In the first leg, Yuliya Stupak of the Russian Olympic Committee won, closely followed by Katherine Sauerbrey of Germany, but developing 12 seconds lead over Finland, 20 seconds over Sweden, and 27 seconds over Norway, for which Therese Johaug, already a double gold medalist at these Olympics, was skiing the second leg. In the second leg, Natalya Nepryayeva of ROC and Katharina Hennig of Germany skied together, with about 25 second lead over a group of skiers, representing Norway, Sweden, Finland, the United States, and Switzerland, with others out of medal contention. At the second exchange, Germany were leading, with ROC 4 seconds behind, Norway 23 seconds behind, and Sweden and Finland 25 seconds behind. The same situation persisted for most of the third leg. Victoria Carl of Germany developed a 5 second lead over Tatiana Sorina of ROC. Norway and Finland were 14 and 18 seconds behind Germany, respectively, Sweden dropped to 35 seconds, with others out of medal contention. In the last leg, Jonna Sundling of Sweden, who earlier became the 2022 Olympic champion in the individual sprint, quickly caught up with her competitors from Norway and Finland. At 17.5km, they were 20 seconds behind Sofie Krehl of Germany and Veronika Stepanova of ROC. Eventually, Stepanova escaped from Krehl, and Sundling won the bronze for Sweden over Krista Pärmäkoski. Norway with Ragnhild Haga finished fifth.

Qualification

Results
The race was started at 15:30.

References

Women's cross-country skiing at the 2022 Winter Olympics